INLA or similar may refer to:

Integrated nested Laplace approximations, a method for approximate Bayesian inference
InlA, one form of the Internalin surface protein found on Listeria monocytogenes
Iraq National Library and Archive
Irish National Liberation Army, an Irish republican socialist paramilitary group formed during the Troubles
Ladakh, India (ISO 3166 code IN-LA)
State Department Air Wing, also called INL/A (International Narcotics and Law Enforcement Affairs Air Wing)